František Křižík (July 8, 1847 – January 22, 1941) was a Czech inventor, electrical engineer, and entrepreneur.

Biography
Křižík was born into a family in Plánice. In spite of his background, Křižík managed in 1866 to study engineering at the Technical University of Prague ČVUT.

Křižík is considered the pioneer of practical electrical engineering and in electrification of Bohemia and Austro-Hungarian empire. At the time he was often compared to Thomas Edison. In 1878 Křižík invented a remotely operated signaling device to protect against collision between trains. Křižík's cores are magnetic
solenoids cores shaped so as to ensure an approximately uniform pull in different positions in the solenoid.

His first experiments in Plzeň resulted in the invention in 1880 of the automatic electric arc lamp, the so-called "Plzen Lamp"  which was displayed at the International Exposition of Electricity in Paris in 1881. This lamp, with self-adjusting brushes, won the gold medal from among 50 similar devices. Later he successfully defended his patent against Werner Siemens claim to have created it first. His lamps were successfully used in many cities for street lighting. The restored and fully functional patented arc lamp with automated electrode adjustment can be viewed at the Museum of Pilsen. In 1894, he designed an electric musical fountain illuminated by coloured lamps, one of the most popular attractions at the General National Exhibition in Lviv.

In 1895 Křižík built one of first electromobiles in Austrian empire.

In 1884 Křižík set up his own company building city lighting, tramway lines, street cars, power stations, and various electric equipment.

A Prague street and subsequently near subway station were named after František Křižík – Křižíkova.

Electrified railway Tábor–Bechyně

František Křižík built the first electrified railway in the Austro-Hungarian empire from Tábor to Bechyně in 1903.

Legacy
The main belt asteroid 5719 Křižík was named in his honor.

References

External links

 Biography 
 František Křižík, has diagram of his differential arc lamp

1847 births
1941 deaths
People from Plánice
Czech engineers
Czech inventors
20th-century Czech businesspeople
Czech Technical University in Prague alumni
19th-century Czech businesspeople